Kyomi Hirata (born 22 July 1982) is a Japanese foil fencer. She competed in the women's team foil competition at the 2012 Summer Olympics.

References

1982 births
Living people
Japanese female foil fencers
Olympic fencers of Japan
Fencers at the 2012 Summer Olympics